Við Stórá is a stadium located in Trongisvágur, Faroe Islands. It is mostly used for football matches and is the home ground of Tvøroyrar Bóltfelag.

History

The stadium replaced TB's old field Sevmýri as their home stadium. The first game played there was a 6th round first division match against ÍF, which TB won 1–0 with the goal scored by Serbian defender Dmitrije Janković.

References

External links
Við Stórá at Nordic Stadiums

Football venues in the Faroe Islands